The Bukit Jalil Highway, or Puchong–Sungai Besi Highway, Federal Route 217, is a major highway in Klang Valley, Malaysia. It is a toll-free and also a second highway after Shah Alam Expressway E5. It connects the Sungai Besi Expressway E9 near Selangor Turf Club in the east to Damansara–Puchong Expressway E11 near Puchong Jaya in the west. The highway passes Bandar Kinrara and Bukit Jalil.

The Kilometre Zero of the highway starts at Puchong Jaya Interchange near Puchong, Selangor. The Kilometre Zero monument is erected near Pos Malaysia Deliver Branch at Puchong Town Centre in Puchong.

History
During 1998 Commonwealth Games in Kuala Lumpur, the highway became a second main route to National Sports Complex in Bukit Jalil after Shah Alam Expressway. In 2004, the highway was gazetted as a Federal Route 217.

At most sections, the Federal Route 217 was built under the JKR R5 road standard, allowing maximum speed limit of up to 90 km/h.

List of interchanges

References

Expressways and highways in the Klang Valley
Highways in Malaysia
Roads in Kuala Lumpur